Frederick M Pearson (February 13, 1827 – April 21, 1875) was a Nova Scotia businessman and political figure. He represented Colchester in the House of Commons of Canada as a Liberal member from 1870 to 1874.

He was born in Pictou, Nova Scotia, the son of John Pearson and Esther McElhenny, in 1827. In 1850, he married Eliza Crowe. Pearson operated a business importing and exporting goods, and also built ships at Masstown; he later stopped building ships and moved the importing and exporting business to Truro. He also served as a justice of the peace. He was elected in an 1870 by-election after Adams George Archibald resigned his seat to become Lieutenant-Governor of Manitoba and the Northwest Territories; he was reelected in 1872.

His son, Benjamin later represented Colchester in the Nova Scotia House of Assembly.

References 

1827 births
1875 deaths
Liberal Party of Canada MPs
Members of the House of Commons of Canada from Nova Scotia
Canadian justices of the peace